FK Inkaras Kaunas Was a former Lithuanian football team from the city of Kaunas. It was founded in 1937 and dissolved in 2003

Achievements

A Lyga: 2
 1995, 1996

Lithuanian SSR Championship: 5
1950, 1951, 1954, 1964, 1965

Lithuanian Cup: 7
 1948, 1949, 1951, 1954, 1965, 1969, 1995

Lithuanian Supercup: 1
 1995

Season-by-season

 Lithuania
{|class="wikitable"
|-bgcolor="#efefef"
! Season
! Div.
! Pos.
! Pl.
! W
! D
! L
! Goals
! P
! Top Scorer
!Cup
!colspan=2|Europe
|-
|align=center|1991
|align=center|1st
|align=center|14
|align=center|14
|align=center|2
|align=center|4
|align=center|8
|align=center|7–15
|align=center|8
|align=center|
|align=center|1/8
|align=center|
|align=left|
|-
|align=center|1991/92
|align=center|1st
|align=center|10
|align=center|25
|align=center|6
|align=center|6
|align=center|13
|align=center|23–28
|align=center|18
|align=center|
|align=center|1/8
|align=center|
|align=left|
|-
|align=center|1992/93
|align=center|1st
|align=center|9
|align=center|23
|align=center|8
|align=center|6
|align=center|9
|align=center|28–28
|align=center|22
|align=center|
|align=center|1/8
|align=center|
|align=left|
|-
|align=center|1993/94
|align=center|1st
|align=center|8
|align=center|22
|align=center|4
|align=center|8
|align=center|10
|align=center|22–34
|align=center|16
|align=center|
|align=center|1/8
|align=center|
|align=left|
|-
|align=center|1994/95
|align=center|1st
|align=center bgcolor=gold|1
|align=center|22
|align=center|16
|align=center|4
|align=center|2
|align=center|50–12
|align=center|32
|align=center|
|align=center bgcolor=gold|Winner
|align=center|
|align=left|
|-
|align=center|1995/96
|align=center|1st
|align=center bgcolor=gold|1
|align=center|28
|align=center|24
|align=center|3
|align=center|1
|align=center|67–9
|align=center|56
|align=center|
|align=center bgcolor=silver|Final
|align=center|UC
|align=left|Preliminary round
|-
|align=center|1996/97
|align=center|1st
|align=center bgcolor=#cc9966|3
|align=center|28
|align=center|15
|align=center|8
|align=center|5
|align=center|41–19
|align=center|53
|align=center|
|align=center bgcolor=silver|Final
|align=center|UC
|align=left|Preliminary round
|-
|align=center|1997/98
|align=center|1st
|align=center|4
|align=center|30
|align=center|19
|align=center|4
|align=center|7
|align=center|60–22
|align=center|61
|align=center|
|align=center|1/8
|align=center|UC
|align=left|1st qualifying round
|-
|align=center|1998/99
|align=center|1st
|align=center|5
|align=center|23
|align=center|11
|align=center|4
|align=center|8
|align=center|34–27
|align=center|37
|align=center|
|align=center|1/4
|align=center|IC
|align=left|2nd Round
|-
|align=center|1999
|align=center|1st
|align=center|6
|align=center|18
|align=center|8
|align=center|5
|align=center|5
|align=center|25–18
|align=center|29
|align=center|
|align=center|1/2
|align=center|
|align=left|
|-
|align=center|2000
|align=center|1st
|align=center|9
|align=center|36
|align=center|5
|align=center|6
|align=center|25
|align=center|28–95
|align=center|21
|align=center|
|align=center|1/4
|align=center|
|align=left|
|-
|align=center|2001
|align=center|1st
|align=center|5
|align=center|36
|align=center|11
|align=center|12
|align=center|13
|align=center|50–44
|align=center|45
|align=center|
|align=center|1/4
|align=center|
|align=left|
|-
|align=center|2002
|align=center|1st
|align=center|5
|align=center|32
|align=center|13
|align=center|7
|align=center|12
|align=center|35–29
|align=center|41
|align=center|
|align=center|1/2
|align=center|
|align=left|
|}

European cup history

References

 
Defunct football clubs in Lithuania
Football clubs in Kaunas
Association football clubs disestablished in 2003
Association football clubs established in 1937
1937 establishments in Lithuania
2003 disestablishments in Lithuania